The East African Community (EAC) is an intergovernmental organisation composed of seven countries in the Great Lakes region of East Africa: the Democratic Republic of the Congo, the United Republic of Tanzania, the Republics of Kenya, Burundi, Rwanda, South Sudan, and Uganda. Évariste Ndayishimiye, the president of Burundi, is the current EAC chairman. The organisation was founded in 1967, collapsed in 1977, and was revived on 7 July 2000.

In 2008, after negotiations with the Southern African Development Community (SADC) and the Common Market for Eastern and Southern Africa (COMESA), the EAC agreed to an expanded free trade area including the member states of all three organizations. The EAC is an integral part of the African Economic Community.

The capital of the EAC is Arusha, Tanzania.

The EAC is a potential precursor to the establishment of the East African Federation, a proposed federation of its members into a single sovereign state. In 2010, the EAC launched its own common market for goods, labour, and capital within the region, with the goal of creating a common currency and eventually a full political federation. In 2013, a protocol was signed outlining their plans for launching a monetary union within 10 years. In September 2018 a committee was formed to begin the process of drafting a regional constitution.

History

Formation and re-formation 

Kenya, Tanzania, and Uganda have cooperated with each other since the early 20th century. The East African Currency Board provided a common currency from 1919 to 1966. The customs union between Kenya and Uganda in 1917, which Tanganyika joined in 1927, was followed by the East African High Commission (EAHC) from 1948 to 1961, the East African Common Services Organization (EACSO) from 1961 to 1967, and the EAC from 1967 to 1977. Burundi and Rwanda joined the EAC on 6 July 2009.

Inter-territorial co-operation between the Kenya Colony, the Uganda Protectorate, and the Tanganyika Territory was formalised in 1948 by the EAHC. This provided a customs union, a common external tariff, currency, and postage. It also dealt with common services in transport and communications, research, and education. Following independence, these integrated activities were reconstituted and the EAHC was replaced by the EACSO, which many observers thought would lead to a political federation between the three territories. The new organisation ran into difficulties because of the lack of joint planning and fiscal policy, separate political policies, and Kenya's dominant economic position. In 1967, the EACSO was superseded by the EAC. This body aimed to strengthen the ties between the members through a common market, a common customs tariff, and a range of public services to achieve balanced economic growth within the region.

In 1977, the EAC collapsed. The causes of the collapse included demands by Kenya for more seats than Uganda and Tanzania in decision-making organs, disagreements with Ugandan dictator Idi Amin who demanded that Tanzania as a member state of the EAC should not harbour forces fighting to topple the government of another member state, and the disparate economic systems of socialism in Tanzania and capitalism in Kenya. The three member states lost over sixty years of co-operation and the benefits of economies of scale, although some Kenyan government officials celebrated the collapse with champagne.

Presidents Daniel arap Moi of Kenya, Ali Hassan Mwinyi of Tanzania, and Yoweri Kaguta Museveni of Uganda signed the Treaty for East African Co-operation in Kampala on  1993 and established a Tri-partite Commission for Co-operation. A process of re-integration was embarked on involving tripartite programmes of co-operation in political, economic, social and cultural fields, research and technology, defence, security, and legal and judicial affairs.

The EAC was revived on 30 November 1999, when the treaty for its re-establishment was signed. It came into force on 7 July 2000, 23 years after the collapse of the previous community and its organs. A customs union was signed in March 2004, which commenced on 1 January 2005. Kenya, the region's largest exporter, continued to pay duties on goods entering the other four countries on a declining scale until 2010. A common system of tariffs will apply to goods imported from third-party countries. On 30 November 2016 it was declared that the immediate aim would be confederation rather than federation.

South Sudan accession
The presidents of Kenya and Rwanda invited the Autonomous Government of Southern Sudan to apply for membership upon the independence of South Sudan in 2011, and South Sudan was reportedly an applicant country as of mid-July 2011. Analysts suggested that South Sudan's early efforts to integrate infrastructure, including rail links and oil pipelines, with systems in Kenya and Uganda indicated intention on the part of Juba to pivot away from dependence on Sudan and toward the EAC. Reuters considers South Sudan the likeliest candidate for EAC expansion in the short term, and an article in Tanzanian daily The Citizen that reported East African Legislative Assembly Speaker Abdirahin Haithar Abdi said South Sudan was "free to join the EAC" asserted that analysts believe the country will soon become a full member of the regional body.

On 17 September 2011, the Daily Nation quoted a South Sudanese MP as saying that while his government was eager to join the EAC, it would likely delay its membership over concerns that its economy was not sufficiently developed to compete with EAC member states and could become a "dumping ground" for Kenyan, Tanzanian, and Ugandan exports. This was contradicted by President Salva Kiir, who announced South Sudan had begun the application process one month later. The application was deferred by the EAC in December 2012, however incidents with Ugandan boda-boda operators in South Sudan have created political tension and may delay the process.

In December 2012, Tanzania agreed to South Sudan's bid to join the EAC, clearing the way for the world's newest state to become the regional bloc's sixth member. In May 2013 the EAC set aside US$82,000 for the admission of South Sudan into the bloc even though admission may not happen until 2016. The process, to start after the EAC Council of Ministers meeting in August 2013, was projected to take at least four years. At the 14th Ordinary Summit held in Nairobi in 2012, EAC heads of state approved the verification report that was presented by the Council of Ministers, then directed it to start the negotiation process with South Sudan.

A team was formed to assess South Sudan's bid; however, in April 2014, the nation requested a delay in the admissions process, presumably due to ongoing internal conflict.

South Sudan's Minister of Foreign Affairs, Barnaba Marial Benjamin, claimed publicly in October 2015 that, following evaluations and meetings of a special technical committee in May, June, August, September and October, the committee has recommended that South Sudan be allowed to join the East African Community. Those recommendations, however, had not been released to the public. It was reported that South Sudan could be admitted as early as November 2015 when the heads of East African States had their summit meeting.

South Sudan was eventually approved for membership to the bloc in March 2016, and signed a treaty of accession in April 2016. It had six months to ratify the agreement, which it did on 5 September, at which point it formally acceded to the community. It does not yet participate to the same extent as the other members.

Democratic Republic of the Congo accession 
In 2010, Tanzanian officials expressed interest in inviting the Democratic Republic of the Congo to join the East African Community. The DRC applied for admission to the EAC in June 2019.  In June 2021, the EAC Summit launched a verification mission to assess the suitability of the DRC for admission to the Community, and has since drafted a report on their findings which is ready for submission to the EAC Council of Ministers. On 23 November 2021: Ministers in charge of East African Community (EAC) Affairs have recommended for consideration by the EAC Heads of States the report of the verification team on the application by The Democratic Republic of Congo (DRC) to join the Community. In February 2022, the EAC Council of Ministers recommended that the DRC be admitted as a new member state of the EAC. On 18 March 2022, the EAC Secretary-General Dr Peter Mathuki confirmed that the Heads of State would approve the admission on 29 March 2022. The Democratic Republic of the Congo was admitted as a member of the EAC on 29 March 2022, at a virtual Head of State summit chaired by Uhuru Kenyatta of Kenya, and officially become a member of the East African Community on 11 July 2022 after depositing the instrument of ratification with the EAC Secretary General at the bloc’s headquarters in Arusha, Tanzania.

The DRC gives the EAC its first port on the African west coast.

Geography

Partner states

Potential expansion

Angola
In 2019, President Lourenço mediated the re-opening of the borders and ending hostilities between EAC neighbours Rwanda and Uganda. Historically, Angola has been closely involved politically with the DRC with a focus on peace and stability in the DRC. Angola is currently leading the Luanda process for stability in the eastern DRC under the ICGLR with EAC Partner States – Uganda and Rwanda.

Central African Republic
EAC partner states Burundi, DR Congo, Rwanda, and Tanzania have been involved in peace keeping missions in the Central African Republic. President Touadera has applauded Rwanda's support in securing peace in the country. With DRC in the EAC, and infrastructure developments from Pointe-Noire in the Republic of Congo to Bangui, as well as inclusion of the country into the LAPSSET project from Lamu-Juba-Bangui-Douala, this could see the mineral and resource rich country realize economic benefits.

Congo-Brazzaville
The Republic of Congo enjoys strong historical political, economic and cultural ties with DR Congo. The Republic of Congo is involved, under the International Conference on the Great Lakes Region (ICGLR), in the peace and stability efforts in eastern DR Congo together with Angola. Rwandan and Ugandan leaders have been meeting in Luanda with President Sassou Nguesso to support these peace efforts.

Ethiopia
Kenyan President Uhuru Kenyatta proposed expanding the EAC to include Central, Northern, and Southern African states, such as Ethiopia. The potential joining of Ethiopia into the EAC would bring the population to approximately 420 million. Speaking at the opening of the One Stop Border post in Moyale in 2020, Prime Minister Abiy Ahmed of Ethiopia affirmed his commitment to regional integration saying that the east African people are one people and economic integration is a key goal for the region to achieve so as to unlock its potential. With other horn of Africa countries like Somalia joining the EAC and the opening up of the Ethiopia's sectors such as banking and telecommunications to the private sector, being part of the EAC could soon become a priority to accelerate economic gains.

Malawi
In 2010, Tanzanian officials expressed interest in inviting Malawi to join the EAC. Malawian Foreign Affairs Minister Etta Banda said, however, that there were no formal negotiations taking place concerning Malawian membership.

Mozambique
Ugandan President Yoweri Museveni in May 2022, hinted at the possibility of deploying an East African regional force to Mozambique to counter insurgency in the Northern Provinces. Rwanda, at the request of Mozambique, in July 2021 had sent a strong contingent to Cabo Delgabo. Mozambique shares cultural and historical ties with EAC Partner States. There is a significant Kiswahili speaking population in the country.

Somalia
Representatives of Somalia applied for membership in the EAC in March 2012. The application was considered by the EAC Heads of State in December 2012, which requested that the EAC Council work with Somalia to verify their application. In February 2015, the EAC again deliberated on the matter but deferred a decision as verification had not yet started nor had preparations with the government of Somalia been finalized. During the 22nd Ordinary EAC Heads of State Summit on 22 July 2022, the EAC Heads of State, noted that the verification process for Somalia to join the community needs to be completed expeditiously. Somalia adds to the EAC, a 3,333 km coastline, a population of about 16 million people, entrepreneurial capital and culture, fisheries, livestock, energy and natural resources. As members of the Community, the country would receive support to deal with internal security matters.

Sudan
The Sudan applied to join the EAC in 2011, but its membership is strongly opposed by Tanzania and Uganda. They contended that because of the Sudan's lack of a direct border with the EAC at the time, its allegedly discriminatory actions toward black Africans, its record of human rights violations, and its history of hostilities with both South Sudan and Uganda, it was ineligible to join. The Sudan's application was rejected by the EAC in December 2011.

Zambia
In 2010, Tanzanian officials expressed interest in inviting Zambia to join the EAC. In the 1960s Zambia had applied to join the EAC. During a state visit to Kenya on 15 June 2022, President Hichilema of Zambia mentioned to the EAC Chairman President Kenyatta, that Zambia is interested in joining an East African Consortium for negotiating trade agreements in oil and agricultural sectors.

Politics
It has been argued, however, that the commonalities go far deeper. Many of the national elites old enough to remember the former EAC often share memories and a sharp sense of loss at its eventual dissolution. More cynically, others have argued that this historical ambition provides politicians with the ability to present themselves as statesmen and representatives of a greater regional interest. Furthermore, EAC institutions bring significant new powers to dispose and depose to those who serve in them.

Some have questioned the extent to which the visions of a political union are shared outside the elite and the relatively elderly, arguing that the youthful mass of the population is not well informed about the process in any of the countries. Others have pointed to an enhanced sense of East African identity developing from modern communications. For these, the shared vision for a politically united East Africa is commendable and a potential driver for change. Commitment to the formal EAC idea is relatively narrow, in both social and generational terms, and thus many have questioned the timetable for the project. Fast-tracking political union was first discussed in 2004 and enjoyed a consensus among the three presidents of Kenya, Tanzania, and Uganda. Thus, a high-level committee headed by Amos Wako of Kenya was commissioned to investigate the possibility of speeding integration so as to achieve political federation sooner than previously visualised. Yet, there have been concerns that rapid changes would allow popular reactionary politics against the project. There has been an argument, however, that there are high costs that would be required at the beginning and that fast-tracking the project would allow the benefits to be seen earlier.

There remain significant political differences between the states. Museveni's success in obtaining his third-term amendment raised doubts in the other countries. The single-party dominance in the Tanzanian and Ugandan parliaments is unattractive to Kenyans, while Kenya's ethnic-politics remains absent in Tanzania. Rwanda has a distinctive political culture with a political elite committed to building a developmental state.

Other problems involve states being reluctant to relinquish involvement in other regional groups, e.g., Tanzania's withdrawal from COMESA but staying within the SADC bloc for the Economic Partnership Agreement negotiations with the European Union. Many Tanzanians are also concerned because creating a common market means removing obstacles to the free movement of labour and capital. Free movement of labour may be perceived as highly desirable in Uganda and Kenya, and have important developmental benefits in Tanzania; however, in Tanzania there is widespread resistance to the idea of ceding land rights to foreigners, including citizens of Kenya and Uganda.

Informal polls have indicated that most Tanzanians (80 percent) have an unfavourable view of the East African Federation. Tanzania has more land than all the other EAC nations combined (at least until the accession of South Sudan), and some Tanzanians fear landgrabs by the current residents of the other EAC member nations.

Governance

East African Court of Justice
The East African Court of Justice is the judicial arm of the community.

East African Legislative Assembly
The East African Legislative Assembly (EALA) is the legislative arm of the community. The EALA has 27 members who are all elected by the National Assemblies or Parliaments of the member states of the community. The EALA has oversight functions on all matters that fall within the community's work and its functions include debating and approving the budget of the community, discussing all matters pertaining to the community and making recommendations to the council as it may deem necessary for the implementation of the treaty, liaising with National Assemblies or Parliaments on matters pertaining to the community and establishing committees for such purposes as it deems necessary. Since being inaugurated in 2001, the EALA has had several sittings as a plenum in Arusha, Kampala, and Nairobi.

The Speaker of the Assembly is Dan Kidega from Uganda who replaced Margaret Zziwa also from Uganda, after being impeached; she had succeeded Abdirahin Haithar H. Abdi from Kenya. The assembly has been credited with crucial bills, particularly those regarding regional and international trade, including EAC's stand on issues such as the World Trade Organization and transport on Lake Victoria.

Economics

Importance of the customs union
The key aspects of the customs union include:
 a Common External Tariff (CET) on imports from third countries;
 duty-free trade between the member states; and
 common customs procedures.

Different rates are applied for raw materials (0%), intermediate products (10%) and finished goods (25%), the latter percentage is fixed as the maximum. This represents a significance decrease from what was previously the maximum in Kenya (35%), Tanzania (40%) and Uganda (15%). However, this customs union is not yet fully implemented, because there is a significant list of exclusions to the Common External Tariff and tariff-free movement of goods and services. Technical work is also needed to harmonise and modernise the customs procedures in the EAC's major ports of entry.

The expected revenue benefits are understood to be minimal by many analysts, based on comparative-static simulation exercises demonstrating the one-off impacts of the immediate introduction of the CU's full tariff package. The findings suggest an increase in intraregional trade that is largely the result of trade diversion, not trade creation, with some aggregate welfare benefits in Kenya and Tanzania but welfare losses in Uganda. From a trade-integration perspective, the EAC may not be the best chosen unit, because the current trade between the three countries is small compared to their external trade, and the EAC's  citizens do not represent a large market in global terms, given the very low average incomes.

Emerging business trends
Business leaders are far more positive than economists about the benefits of EAC integration, its customs union as a step in the process, as well as the wider integration under COMESA. The larger economic players perceive long-term benefits in a progressively expanding regional market. Patterns of regional development are already emerging, including:
 Kenyan firms have successfully aligned to the lower protection afforded by the EAC CET and fears that firms would not adjust to a 25% maximum CET, or would relocate to Tanzania or Uganda have not been realised.
 An intraregional division of labour is developing, which results in basic import-processing relocating to the coast to supply the hinterland. The final stages of import-processing (especially those bulky finished goods that involve high transportation costs) and natural-resource based activities are moving up-country and up-region, either within value chains of large companies or different segments located by firms in different countries.
 Trade in goods and services has already increased as service provision to Kenyans and Tanzanians is already important for Uganda (in education and in health). Kenya exports financial services, for example via the Kenya Commercial Bank and purchase and upgrading of local operators in Tanzania, Uganda and Sudan. Uganda hopes integration will help support its tourism potential through integration with established regional circuits.
 There are signs of a business culture oriented to making profits through economies of scale and not on protectionism.

Trade negotiations

The EAC negotiates with trade partners on behalf of all member countries. Negotiations in 2014 for an EU-EAC Economic Partnership Agreement (EPA) ran into difficulties with the January 2014 negotiating session failing to conclude the negotiations, which were scheduled to be completed before 1 October 2014. This caused tensions between Kenya and other countries as Kenya, which is not a Least Developed Country, stood to lose most from the failure to reach agreement. Discussions are also under way between the EAC and the USA on the launch of Trade and Investment Partnership (TIP) negotiations.

Poverty reduction
EAC that have economies have large informal sectors, unintegrated with the formal economy and large business. The concerns of large-scale manufacturing and agro-processing concerns are not broadly shared by the bulk of available labour. Research suggest the promised investments on the conditions of life of the region's overwhelmingly rural poor will be slight, with the significant exception of agro-industrial firms with out-grower schemes or that otherwise contribute to the co-ordination of smallholder production and trade.

It is informal trade across borders that is most often important to rural livelihoods and a customs union is unlikely to significantly impact the barriers that this faces and taxes are still being fixed separately by countries. However, the introduction of one-stop border posts being introduced and the reduction in tariff barriers are coming down progressively.

The establishment of a common market will create both winners (numerous food producers and consumers on both sides of all borders) and losers (smugglers and the customs, police and local government officers who currently benefit from bribery at and around the borders) in the border areas. More substantial impact could be attained by a new generation of investments in world-market production based on the region's comparative advantages in natural resources (especially mining and agriculture) and the new tariff structure creates marginally better conditions for world-market exporters, by cheapening inputs and by reducing upward pressures on the exchange rate.

Common market

On 1 July 2010, Kenyan President Mwai Kibaki launched the East African Common Market Protocol, an expansion of the bloc's existing customs union that entered into effect in 2005. The protocol will leads the free movement of labour, capital, goods and services within the EAC. Member states will have to change their national laws to allow the full implementation of some aspects of the Common Market such as immigration and customs. Kenya expects that its citizens will begin to enjoy freedom of movement in the EAC within two months. Kenya, Rwanda and Burundi have already agreed to waive work permit fees for EAC citizens. The Common Market is seen as a step towards the implementation of a common currency by 2024 and full political federation afterwards. Kenyan businesses complain that the benefits of the Common Market only exist on paper by 2011, and that all the work remains to be done. Arbitrary rules and delays continue to make trade between Kenya and Tanzania expensive and difficult.

The free movement of people in the EAC is set to be improved with the introduction of "third generation" ID cards.  These cards will identify the holder as a dual citizen of their home country and of "East Africa". Third generation cards are already in use in Rwanda with Kenya set to introduce them in July 2010 and the other countries following afterwards. Mutual recognition and accreditation of higher education institutions is also being worked towards as is the harmonisation of social security benefits across the EAC.

Transport
Mombasa has the East African Community's busiest port. However, the construction of a new port in Kenya, known as the Lamu Port is underway. It is expected to cost US$22 billion, which will make it the biggest port in all of Africa. Upon completion the Bagamoyo port under construction in Tanzania will be the second largest port in Africa, with a capacity to handle 18.9 million cargo containers a year.

Business and finance

Many of the EAC's largest firms are headquartered in Nairobi, including Kenya Airways, the Nation Media Group, and the Kenya Commercial Bank Group. The multinational firms with their regional headquarters in Nairobi include Google, Coca-Cola, and Toyota. The city is also home to the Nairobi Securities Exchange. According to a 2007 published report, it is Africa's fourth largest in terms of trading volumes and fifth largest in terms of market capitalization as a percentage of gross domestic product.

Plans

The new treaty was proposed with plans drawn up in 2004 to introduce a monetary union with a common currency, the East African shilling, some time between 2012 and 2015. There were also plans for a political union, the East African Federation, with a common President (initially on a rotation basis) and a common parliament by 2010. However, some experts like those based in the public think tank Kenya Institute of Public Policy Research and Analysis (KIPPRA), noted that the plans were too ambitious to be met by 2010 because a number of political, social and economic challenges are yet to be addressed. The proposal was the subject of National Consultative discussions, and a final decision was to be taken by the EAC Heads of State in mid-2007. In 2013, a protocol was signed outlining their plans for launching a monetary union within 10 years.

In September 2018, a committee was formed to begin the process of drafting a regional constitution.

In January 2023, the East African Community (EAC) plans to issue a single currency within the next four years. The Council of Ministers of the organization must decide on the location of the East African Monetary Institute and the establishment of a roadmap for the issuance of the single currency.

Single tourist visa
It had been hoped that an East African Single Tourist Visa may have been ready for November 2006, if it was approved by the relevant sectoral authorities under the EAC's integration programme. Had it been approved, the visa would have been valid for all three current member states of the EAC (Kenya, Tanzania and Uganda). Under the proposal for the visa, any new EAC single visa could be issued by any member state's embassy. The visa proposal followed an appeal by the tourist boards of the partner states for a common visa to accelerate promotion of the region as a single tourist destination and the EAC Secretariat wanted it approved before November's World Travel Fair (or World Travel Market) in London. When approved by the EAC's council of ministers, tourists could apply for one country's entry visa which would then be applicable in all regional member states as a single entry requirement initiative.

A single East African Tourist Visa for the EAC countries of Kenya, Rwanda, and Uganda has been available since 2014.

Demographics
As of March 2022, the combined population of all seven EAC member states was 312,362,653. The EAC would have the fourth largest population in the world, if considered a single entity.

The EAC contains 14 cities with populations of over one million (half of which are in Democratic Republic of the Congo alone), the largest being Kinshasa. Kampala is the largest urban centre located on Lake Victoria, the second largest freshwater lake in the world and Mwanza coming in second and Kisumu third.

The East African Community's current urban population stands at about 20%

Religion

Languages
Kiswahili, English and French are designated as the official languages of the EAC, with Swahili designated for development as the lingua franca of the community. Within the EAC, there are three countries whose official language is French: the Democratic Republic of the Congo, Rwanda and Burundi. Numerous local languages are also spoken: for example, there are 56 local languages spoken in Uganda, 125 in Tanzania, 72 in South Sudan and 67 local languages in Kenya. Kinyarwanda is spoken in Rwanda and Uganda. There are over 200 local languages spoken in the DRC. Lingala is widely spoken in the western Democratic Republic of Congo, with about 15 million speakers and Kiswahili with 23 million speakers across the country.

East African passport

The East African passport was launched on  1999. The East African passport has been introduced as a travel document to ease border crossing for EAC residents. It is valid for travel within the EAC countries only and will entitle the holder to a multi-entry stay of renewable six months' validity in any of the countries. The passport is issued in three of the seven EAC member states (Kenya, Uganda and Tanzania). The passports are available at the headquarters of the respective Immigration Departments in Nairobi, Kampala and Dar es Salaam. Only East African nationals may apply to be issued with the passports. The passport costs US$10 or the equivalent in EAC currencies. Processing of applications for the passports will normally take two to three weeks. Although the passport is only valid within the EAC, modalities of internationalising the East African passport were being discussed with the aim towards having a common travel document for EAC residents by 2006.

Other measures meant to ease border crossing for East African Community residents include the issuance of interstate passes (which commenced on  2003), a single immigration Departure/Entry card (adopted by all three member states), the finalisation of harmonised procedures of work permits and the classification process, and the compilation of studies on the Harmonization of Labour Laws and Employment Policies (now in its final stages).

Leaders

Current leaders of the EAC

Chairman
 2012–2013  Yoweri Museveni
 2013–2015  Uhuru Kenyatta
 2015–2017 John Magufuli
 2017–2019  Yoweri Museveni
 2019–2021  Paul Kagame
 2021–2022  Uhuru Kenyatta
 2022–Present Evarist Ndayishimiye

Secretaries-General
 2000–2001   Francis Muthaura
 2001–2006   Amanya Mushega
 2006–2011   Juma Mwapachu
 2011–2016   Richard Sezibera
 2016–2021   Libérat Mfumukeko
 2021–present   Peter Mathuki

Comparison with other regional blocs

Add DRC

See also
 17th EAC Extra Ordinary summit
 CASSOA
 EAC Railway Masterplan
 East African Federation
 East African Community Treaty
 East African School of Taxation
 Economy of Africa
 List of Trade blocs
 Intergovernmental Authority on Development (IGAD)
 Southern African Development Community (SADC)
 Common Market for Eastern and Southern Africa (COMESA)
 Economic Community of Central African States (ECCAS)
 Economic Community of West African States (ECOWAS)
Rules of Origin
Market access
Free-trade area
Tariffs

References

External links

 
 East African Community in Europe
 German and East African Community Cooperation
 EAC Free Trade Agreement
 Agritrade Agricultural trade in East Africa

 
1967 establishments in Africa
1977 disestablishments in Africa
2000 establishments in Africa
African Union
Arusha
Customs unions
East Africa
Economy of Burundi
Economy of the Democratic Republic of the Congo
Economy of Kenya
Economy of Rwanda
Economy of South Sudan
Economy of Tanzania
Economy of Uganda
Foreign relations of the Democratic Republic of the Congo
Foreign relations of Kenya
Foreign relations of Rwanda
Foreign relations of South Sudan
Foreign relations of Tanzania
Foreign relations of Uganda
International organizations based in Africa
Regional Economic Communities of the African Union
Trade blocs